Luise Amtsberg ( von Jackowski, born 17 October 1984) is a German politician of Alliance 90/The Greens who has been a member of the German Bundestag since the federal election in 2013. She contested the constituency of Kiel in 2013 and 2017.

In addition to her parliamentary work, Amtsberg has been serving as the Federal Government Commissioner for Human Rights Policy and Humanitarian Assistance in the government of Chancellor Olaf Scholz since 2022.

Early life and education
Amtsberg grew up in the East Berlin district of Karlshorst. In 2004, she graduated from high school in Hemmoor, Lower Saxony.

From 2004 to 2013, Amtsberg studied Islamic Studies, Political Science and Theology at the Christian-Albrechts-University Kiel. During her studies, she served as AStA chairwoman from 2006. In 2013, she graduated with a master's thesis on feminism in Islam using the example of the Palestinian women's movement.

Political career
From 2009 to 2012 Amtsberg was a member of the State Parliament of Schleswig-Holstein, where she served as her parliamentary group's spokesperson on refugees and Neo-Nazism. From 2012 to 2013, she served as chairwoman of the Kiel Greens.

In the 2013 elections, Amtsberg was elected into the Bundestag for the Green Party in Schleswig-Holstein. In parliament, she has been a member of the Committee on Internal Affairs since 2014. In this capacity, she is also her parliamentary group's spokesperson on refugees. From 2014 until 2017, she also served on the Committee on Petitions. In 2017, she ran again on list position 1 and as a direct candidate in the constituency of Kiel 5 and was re-elected.

In addition to her committee assignments, Amtsberg has been part of the German delegation to the Parliamentary Assembly of the Council of Europe since 2014. She has served as deputy chairwoman of the German-Turkish Parliamentary Friendship Group (since 2018) and the Parliamentary Friendship Group for Relations with Arabic-Speaking States in the Middle East, which is in charge of maintaining inter-parliamentary relations with Bahrain, Iraq, Yemen, Jordan, Qatar, Kuwait, Lebanon, Oman, Saudi Arabia, Syria, United Arab Emirates, and the Palestinian territories (2013–2017). She is also a member of the German-Egyptian Parliamentary Friendship Group and the Parliamentary Friendship Group for Relations with the Maghreb States.

In December 2014, Amtsberg and Katrin Göring-Eckardt visited the Zaatari refugee camp in Jordan to learn more about the plight of Syrians fleeing the violence in the ongoing Syrian civil war that erupted in 2011.

Under the umbrella of the German Parliaments' godparenthood program for human rights activists, Amtsberg has been raising awareness for the work of persecuted dissidents Narges Mohammadi of Iran, Günal Kurşun of Turkey, and Issa Amro of Palestine.

In the negotiations to form a so-called traffic light coalition of the Social Democratic Party (SPD), the Green Party and the Free Democrats (FDP) following the 2021 German elections, Amtsberg led her party's delegation in the working group on migration and integration; the co-chairs from the other parties were Boris Pistorius and Joachim Stamp.

Other activities
 German Federal Film Board (FFA), Member of the Supervisory Board (since 2022)
 Federal Foundation for the Reappraisal of the SED Dictatorship, Alternate Member of the Board of Trustees
 German-Arab Friendship Association (DAFG), Member of the Board
 Action Reconciliation Service for Peace (ASF), Member
 Pro Asyl, Member

Personal life
Amtsberg is married. In 2016, she gave birth to a son. The family lives in Berlin.

References

External links
 

Members of the Bundestag for Schleswig-Holstein
Living people
1984 births
People from Greifswald
University of Kiel alumni
Female members of the Bundestag
Members of the Bundestag 2021–2025
Members of the Bundestag 2017–2021
Members of the Bundestag 2013–2017
Members of the Bundestag for Alliance 90/The Greens
21st-century German women politicians